Orogrande Airport  is a public-use airport located one nautical mile (1.15 mi, 1.85 km) northeast of the central business district of Orogrande, in Idaho County, Idaho, United States. It is owned by the U.S. Forest Service.

Facilities and aircraft 
It has one runway designated 1/19 with a turf/dirt surface measuring 2,800 by 50 feet (853 x 15 m). For the 12-month period ending September 5, 2009, the airport had 100 general aviation aircraft operations, an average of 8 per month.

References

External links 
 Aerial photo as of 13 September 1998 from USGS The National Map
 

Airports in Idaho
Transportation in Idaho County, Idaho